Tritec may refer to:

 A joint venture between Chrysler and BMW/Rover to produce the Tritec car engine
 The brand name for ranitidine bismuth citrate, a drug used to treat Helicobacter pylori infections